Jiaozi  (pinyin: jiǎozi) are Chinese dumplings commonly eaten in China and other parts of East Asia. Jiaozi are folded to resemble Chinese sycee and have great cultural significance attached to them within China. Jiaozi are one of the major dishes eaten during the Chinese New Year throughout Northern China and eaten all year round in the northern provinces. Though considered part of Chinese cuisine, jiaozi are popular in other parts of East Asia and in the Western world, where a fried variety is sometimes called potstickers in North America and Chinese dumplings in the UK and Canada. The English-language term "potsticker" is a calque of the Mandarin word "guotie" (鍋貼). Potsticker was used by Buwei Yang Chao and her husband Yuen Ren Chao in the book How to Cook and Eat in Chinese, which was first published in 1945. In northern China, however, "guotie" specifically refers to a type of pan-fried jiaozi with its ends left open rather than just any pan-fried jiaozi.

Jiaozi typically consist of a ground meat and/or vegetable filling wrapped into a thinly rolled piece of dough, which is then sealed by pressing the edges together. Finished jiaozi can be boiled (shuǐ jiǎo), steamed (zhēng jiǎo), pan fried (jiān jiǎo), or deep fried (zhá jiǎo), and are traditionally served with a black vinegar and sesame oil dip. They can also be served in a soup (tāng jiǎo).

Origin and custom

In China, there are several different folk stories explaining the origin of jiaozi and its name.

Traditionally, jiaozi were thought to be invented during the era of the Eastern Han (AD 25–220) by Zhang Zhongjing who was a great practitioner of traditional Chinese medicine. Jiaozi were originally referred to as "tender ears" because they were used to treat frostbitten ears. Zhang Zhongjing was on his way home during wintertime, when he found many common people had frostbitten ears, because they did not have warm clothes and sufficient food. He treated these poor people by stewing lamb, black pepper, and some warming medicines in a pot, chopped them, and used them to fill small dough wrappers. He boiled these dumplings and gave them with the broth to his patients, until the coming of the Chinese New Year. In order to celebrate the New Year as well as recovering from frostbitten ears, people imitated Zhang's recipe to make Jiao'er.

Other theories suggest that jiaozi may have derived from dumplings in Western Asia. In the Western Han dynasty (206 BC – AD 9) jiaozi were called jiaozi. During the Three Kingdoms period (AD 220–280), the book Guangya by Zhang Yi mentions jiaozi. Yan Zhitui during the Northern Qi dynasty (AD 550–577) wrote: "Today the jiaozi, shaped like a crescent moon, is a common food in the world." Six Dynasties Turfan tombs contained dumplings. Later in the Tang dynasty (AD 618–907), jiaozi become more popular, called Bian Shi. Chinese archaeologists have found a bowl of jiaozi in the Tang dynasty tombs in Turpan. 7th or 8th century dumplings and wontons were found in Turfan.

Jiaozi may also be named because they are horn-shaped. The Chinese word for "horn" is jiao, and jiaozi was originally written with the Chinese character for "horn", but later it was replaced by the specific character , which has the food radical on the left and the phonetic component  on the right.

At the same time, jiaozi look like yuan bao silver or gold ingots used as currency during the Ming dynasty, and as the name sounds like the word for the earliest paper money, serving them is believed to bring prosperity. Many families eat these at midnight on Chinese New Year's Eve. Some cooks will even hide a clean coin inside a jiaozi for the lucky to find.

Nowadays, jiaozi are eaten year-round, and can be eaten for breakfast, lunch or dinner. They can be served as an appetizer, a side dish, or as the main course. In China, sometimes jiaozi is served as a last course during restaurant meals. As a breakfast dish, jiaozi are prepared alongside xiaolongbao at inexpensive roadside restaurants. Typically, they are served in small steamers containing ten pieces each. Although mainly serving jiaozi to breakfast customers, these small restaurants keep them hot on steamers and ready to eat all day. Jiaozi are always served with a dipping sauce that may include vinegar, soy sauce, garlic, ginger, rice wine, hot sauce, and sesame oil. They can also be served with soup.

Types 

Chinese dumplings (jiaozi) may be divided into various types depending on how they are cooked:
 Boiled dumplings
 Steamed dumplings
 Pan-fried dumplings, and  also referred to as "pot-stickers" 
 Deep fried dumplings
 Soup dumplings

Dumplings that use egg rather than dough to wrap the filling are called "egg dumplings".

Pan-fried dumplings can be joined together by a brown, crispy lattice base created by pouring a flour and water mix into the pan at the end of cooking. In Chinese, this is known as "frost" or "ice crystal" (冰花). The dumplings can also be joined together with an egg base which is topped with green onion and sesame seeds.

Fillings 

Common dumpling meat fillings include chicken, pork, beef, shrimp, and fish which are usually mixed with chopped vegetables. Popular vegetable fillings include napa cabbage, scallion (spring onions), celery, leek, spinach, mushroom, carrot, garlic chives, and edible black fungus.

Folding technique 

There are many ways to fold jiaozi. Basically, steps for folding the skin includes putting a single pleat in the middle, putting multiple pleats along the edge, making a wavy edge like a pie crust, turning a pleated edge in toward the body resulting in a rounded edge, and putting both ends together resulting in a round shape. Different shapes of Jiaozi require different folding techniques, but the most famous and common technique is the pinched-edge fold. Take a wrapper and put one tablespoon of filling into the center of the wrapper. Fold a half of edge to the other half. Use left thumb and forefinger to pinch one side of the half-moon wrapper, and then use right thumb to push the inside skin outward, right forefinger to make outside skin into small pleats. Use right thumb to clench those pleats. Repeat these steps to the other side of the wrapper, and make sure to clench the seal of Jiaozi. This is crescent-shaped jiaozi, the most popular shape in China.

Variations

Guangdong
Jiaozi is called gaau ji in Cantonese and are standard fare in Guangdong style dim sum. The immediate noted difference to Northern style is that they are smaller and wrapped in a thinner translucent skin, and usually steamed. The smaller size and the thinner wrapper make the dumplings easier to cook through with steaming. In contrast to jiaozi, Guangdong gaau ji are rarely home-made because the wrapper, which needs to be thin but tough enough to not break, is more difficult to make. Many types of fillings exist, with the most common type being har gow, but fillings can include scallop, chicken, tofu, and mixed vegetables; dim sum restaurants often feature their own house specials or innovations. Dim sum chefs and artists often use ingredients in new or creative ways, or draw inspiration from other Chinese culinary traditions, such as Chaozhou, Hakka, or Shanghai. More creative chefs may even create fusion gaau ji by using elements from other cultures, such as Japanese (teriyaki) or Southeast Asian (satay or curry), while upscale restaurants may use expensive or exotic ingredients such as lobster, shark fin and bird's nest.

Another Cantonese dumpling is yau gok, which are made with glutinous rice dough and deep fried.

Guotie

Guotie are a northern Chinese style dumpling popular as a street food, appetizer, or side order in Chinese cuisine. Guotie differs from pan fried dumplings, or jianjiao, in that the shape of guotie is usually elongated and the two ends are often left open. Guotie is sometimes served on a dim sum menu, but may be offered independently. The filling for both guotie and jianjiao usually contains pork (sometimes chicken, or beef in Muslim areas), cabbage (or Chinese cabbage and sometimes spinach), scallions (spring or green onions), ginger, Chinese rice wine or cooking wine, and sesame seed oil. In southern China, the term "guotie" is often used as a synonym for the typical jianjiao rather than referring to a particular variety of it.

Gyōza

Gyoza are a Japanese version of jiaozi that were developed from recipes brought back by Japanese soldiers returning from the Japanese-backed puppet state of Manchukuo in northeastern China during World War II. The Japanese word gyōza derives from giǎoze, the Jilu Mandarin pronunciation of the standard Mandarin jiǎozi, and is often written using the same Chinese characters.

The prevalent differences between Japanese-style gyōza and Chinese-style jiaozi are the rich garlic flavor, which is less noticeable in the Chinese version, and that gyōza wrappers tend to be thinner, due to the fact that most Japanese restaurants use machine-made wrappers. In contrast, the rustic cuisine of poor Chinese immigrants shaped westerners' views that Chinese restaurant jiaozi use thicker handmade wrappers. As jiaozi vary greatly across regions within China, these differences are not as clear in the country of origin. For example, visitors will easily find thin-skinned jiaozi at restaurants in Shanghai and at street food vendors in the Hangzhou region. Gyōza wrappers are actually identical to jiaozi wrappers seen in Chinese households using store-bought machine-made wrappers. Gyōza are usually served with soy-based tare sauce seasoned with rice vinegar and/or chili oil (rāyu in Japanese, làyóu in Mandarin Chinese). The most common recipe is a mixture of minced pork (sometimes chicken or beef), cabbage, Asian chives, and sesame oil, and/or garlic, and/or ginger, which is then wrapped in the thinly rolled dough skins. Gyoza share similarities with both pierogi and spring rolls and are cooked in the same fashion as pierogi, either boiled or fried.

Gyōza and gyōza wrappers can be found in supermarkets and restaurants throughout Japan, either frozen or ready to eat. Pan-fried gyōza are sold as a side dish in many ramen and Chinese restaurants. Both the wrappers and the prepared gyōza themselves are increasingly easy to find in Asian markets around the world.

The most popular preparation method is the pan-fried style called yaki-gyōza, in which the dumpling is first fried on one flat side, creating a crispy skin. Then, water is added and the pan sealed with a lid, until the upper part of the dumpling is steamed. This technique is what the Chinese call guotie or potstickers (see above). Other popular methods include boiling sui-gyōza and deep frying age-gyōza.

Store-bought frozen dumplings are often prepared at home by first placing them in a pot of water, bringing it to a boil, and then transferring them to a pan with oil to fry the skin.

Momo
 
The Tibetan and Nepalese version is known as momo (Tibetan: མོག་མོག་; Nepali: मम). The word "momo" comes from a Chinese loanword, "momo" (饃饃), which translates to "steamed bread". When preparing momo, flour is filled, most commonly with ground water buffalo meat. Often, ground lamb or chicken meat is used as alternate to water buffalo meat. In Nepal there is also a vegetarian option where mixtures of potato, cheese and other vegetable items are mixed. Finely chopped onion, minced garlic, fresh minced ginger, cumin powder, salt, coriander/cilantro, etc. are added to the meat for flavor. A sauce made from cooked tomatoes flavored with Sichuan pepper and minced red chilies is often served along with momo.

The Nepalese momo is usually served with dipping sauces that include tomato based chutneys or sesame based sauces. Sauces can be thick or thin consistency depending on the eatery (locally called chutney/achhar), that is normally made with tomato as the base ingredient. In Kathmandu valley, the traditional way of serving momo (momocha) is 10 ping-pong ball sized round momo drowned in a tangy, tomatoey and nutty broth or sauce called Jhol (watery soup / broth in Nepali) achar (served at room temperature, with watery / runny consistency, also known as Kathmandu style momo). Jhol momo has a warm or hot broth poured over momo (not cooked in the soup / broth). To make the jhol achar one of the main ingredients is Nepali Hog Plum (Lapsi), but if unavailable, lemon or lime juice can be used.

Jiaozi and wonton 
Jiaozi are often confused with wonton. Jiaozi have a thicker skin and a relatively flatter, more oblate, double-saucer like shape, and are usually eaten with a soy-vinegar dipping sauce (and/or hot chili sauce), while wontons have thinner skin and are usually served in broth as soup. The dough for the jiaozi and wonton wrappers also consist of different ingredients.

See also

References

American Chinese cuisine
Appetizers
Beijing cuisine
Canadian Chinese cuisine
Cantonese cuisine
Chinese inventions
Chinese New Year foods
Dim sum
Dumplings
Fried foods
Hakka cuisine
Hong Kong cuisine
Japanese cuisine
Northeastern Chinese cuisine
Shanghai cuisine
Steamed foods
Street food
Taiwanese cuisine
Teochew cuisine